Talkin' to Your Heart is an album recorded by Jim Reeves and released in 1961 on the RCA Victor label (catalog no. LPM-2339). The album was produced by Chet Atkins. Don Richardson Sr. wrote the liner notes.

Track listing
Side A
 "Trouble in the Amen Corner" (Campbell) [2:58]
 "I'm Waiting for Ships That Never Come In" (Olman, Yellen) [2:14]
 "Annabel Lee" (Kerr, Poe) [2:35]
 "The Gun" (Reeves, M. Burk, R. Burk) [2:48]
 "The Farmer and the Lord" (Wilson) [2:10]
 "The Shifting Whispering Sands" (M. Gilbert, V. Gilbert) [5:35]

Side B
 "Old Tige" (Reeves, M. Gilbert, V. Gilbert) [2:54]
 "Why Do I Love You (Melody of Love)" (Engelmann, Davies) [1:54]
 "(Far Away Feeling) The Spell of the Yukon" (Kerr, Service) [4:14]
 "Men With Broken Hearts" (Williams) [2:24]
 "Too Many Parties and Too Many Pals" (Rose, Dixon, Henderson) [2:33]
 "Seven Days" (Selman, Reeves) [2:55]

References

1961 albums
Jim Reeves albums